Ňagov is a village and municipality in the Medzilaborce District in the Prešov Region of far north-eastern Slovakia.

History
In historical records, the village is first mentioned in 1557. Then, after some years, it was called a village and municipality of Slovakia.

Geography
The municipality lies at an altitude of 372 metres and covers an area of 9.646 km². It has a population of about 415 people.

References

External links
 
 

 Statistical Office of the Slovak Republic

Villages and municipalities in Medzilaborce District